Lecithocera carcinopsis is a moth in the family Lecithoceridae. It was described by Edward Meyrick in 1929. It is found in southern India.

The wingspan is about 11 mm. The forewings are whitish ochreous irrorated (sprinkled) with fuscous and dark fuscous. The first discal stigma is formed of one or two dark fuscous specks, the second forming a small irregular blackish spot, a similar spot on the dorsum beneath it. The hindwings are pale grey.

References

Moths described in 1929
carcinopsis